Jacob Edward Hoffman (born March 20, 1981) is an American actor, music video director and writer.

Life  
Jake Hoffman was born in Los Angeles County, the son of actor Dustin Hoffman and Lisa Hoffman (née Gottsegen).

In 2003, he graduated from NYU Film School.

In July 2022, he married Amit Dishon, an Israeli designer.

Career
Hoffman has directed music videos; he has written and directed short films. He is most known for his work as an actor. In 2006, he played the adult version of Adam Sandler's son Ben Newman in the comedy fantasy film Click.

Hoffman and his father were cast as grandson and grandfather in the HBO television series Luck (2012). He played shoe designer Steve Madden in Martin Scorsese's The Wolf of Wall Street (2013).

Hoffman made his feature film directorial debut with Asthma (2014).

1550 Blue Jay Way
On December 22, 2016, 1550 Blue Jay Way, LLC entered into bankruptcy proceedings. Located in the Bird Streets of the Hollywood Hills, the modest single-family home at 1550 Blue Jay Way was purchased on June 1, 2015, for $7.5 million with a $3 million investment from Dustin and Jacob Hoffman through DJ Blue Jay Way, LLC. Jacob Hoffman and his friend at New York University, Jeffrey Yohai, planned to develop the house into a luxurious $30 million mansion through Yohai's Marin West. 

In late December 2016, 1550 Blue Jay Way's $4.85 million loan from Genesis Capital was apparently financially backed with Chicago-based Steve Calk's Federal Savings Bank through Summerbreeze, LLC. The four properties at 1550 Blue Jay Way, 779 Stradella Road, 2401 Nottingham Avenue, and 2521 Nottingham Avenue were held under LLCs with majority ownership by Baylor Holdings, LLC, which was a 50-50 ownership of Paul Manafort and Jeffrey Yohai, who was Manafort's daughter Jessica's husband at the time. 

From March to mid-September 2016, numerous unusual transactions with a Banc of California account for Baylor Holdings, LLC occurred; this resulted in the bank closing that account and filing a week before the 2016 elections a Suspicious Activity Report (SAR) with the Financial Crimes Enforcement Network (FinCEN) of the US Treasury. The four properties had defaulted loans at nearly the same time that Manafort was obtaining loans from the Federal Savings Bank of Chicago. 

The unusual financing and ownership structures involving Manafort attracted Robert Mueller's Trump-Russia investigation which gained a plea deal from Jeffrey Yohai in May 2018. 

During Manafort's Virginia Trial in 2018, prosecutors raised questions about Manafort's financing of four properties in California.

Filmography

Film

Television

Notes

References

External links

1981 births
Living people
21st-century American male actors
American male child actors
American male film actors
American male television actors
American people of Romanian-Jewish descent
American people of Ukrainian-Jewish descent
Film directors from California
Jewish American male actors
Male actors from Los Angeles
Tisch School of the Arts alumni